"Free Language Demons / Up On the Roof" is a split EP between Kansas City, Missouri emo band The Get Up Kids and the San Diego, California punk outfit Rocket From the Crypt. The album was released on colored vinyl in 2000 on Vagrant Records. There were seven different pressings of the album, with each pressing on different colored vinyl. Each song was recorded separately; "Up On The Roof" was recorded at West Beach Recorders in the summer of 1999 while the band was recording their second full-length album Something to Write Home About. "Free Language Demons" was recorded at Big Fish Studios in San Diego, during the recording session for the band's Vagrant Records debut, Group Sounds.

Track listing

Release Info
The EP was released on 7" colored vinyl, in four batches; The most widely available was the white vinyl, with 3,000 copies produced. There were also 800 orange copies made, 500 blue copies, and only 300 gray colored records. The Get Up Kids re-released "Up on the Roof" on their B-Sides collection Eudora in 2000.

Personnel

Rocket From the Crypt - Band
Speedo - guitar, vocals
Petey X - bass
Apollo 9 - saxophone
Atom - drums
ND - guitar
JC 2000 - trumpet

Rocket From the Crypt - Production
Production - Rocket From the CryptBen Moore - Engineer, MixingOther PersonnelJeremy Dean - Package DesignThe Get Up Kids - BandMatt Pryor - Vocals, Guitar
Jim Suptic - Guitar, Backing Vocals
Rob Pope - Bass
Ryan Pope - Drums
James Dewees - KeyboardsThe Get Up Kids - Production'''
Alex Brahl - Producer, Engineer
Don Zientara - Additional Engineer (Inner Ear Studios)
Jay Gordon - Additional Engineer (West Beach Studios)

References

The Get Up Kids EPs
Rocket from the Crypt albums
2001 EPs
Split EPs